Ocean County Courthouse is in Toms River, Ocean County, New Jersey, U.S. It was built in 1851. It was added to the New Jersey Register of Historic Places (#2292) in 1981 and National Register of Historic Places (#83001610) in 1983 as the Ocean County Court House.

See also
County courthouses in New Jersey
Richard J. Hughes Justice Complex
National Register of Historic Places listings in Ocean County, New Jersey

References 

Government buildings completed in 1851
County courthouses in New Jersey
Greek Revival architecture in New Jersey
National Register of Historic Places in Ocean County, New Jersey
New Jersey Register of Historic Places
Tourist attractions in Ocean County, New Jersey
Buildings and structures in Ocean County, New Jersey
Toms River, New Jersey
Courthouses on the National Register of Historic Places in New Jersey